Krypton is a Romanian rock band formed in 1982 by  Eugen Mihăescu.

History
With the original line-up consisting of Eugen Mihăescu (guitars), Gabriel Golescu (guitar), Mihai Rotaru (drums) and George Lungu (bass), they managed to release their first songs on the Romanian state sanctioned Electrecord label's, "Formații rock 7" compilation in 1982.

Following a major line-up change, bass player Dragoș Docan, drummer Liviu Pop and vocalist Marius Voicu join the band, laying the foundation for the more well-known group. After being invited to numerous events, even securing a slot at the famous Cenaclul Flacăra, the group managed to sign a deal with Electrecord, releasing their first LP, "30 minute". Their sound at this time was keyboard driven new wave inspired melodic hard rock.

During the summer of 1989, founding member Eugen Mihăescu fled to Germany, so he only participated as a guest on the 1990 record "Fără Teamă", even though he composed a good portion of the material. This LP shows the first signs of the heavy metal influenced style which the band later became known for.

By 1991, Eugen Mihăescu returned to the band, and they finished recording their most ambitious project, the rock opera "Lanțurile", which was released as a double LP. The album features a full on heavy metal sound, and deals with the theme of the Romanian Revolution.

In 1993, Mihăescu leaves Krypton once again, deciding to focus on a solo career. The rest of the group continues to have sporadic activity throughout the 90's, even releasing the full-length album "Am dormit prea mult" in 1998, before eventually splitting up in 1999.

In 2000, Eugen Mihăescu re-establishes the group with a new line-up including vocalist Răzvan Fodor. The release of the 2001 record "Comercial" marks the beginning of a new era for the ensemble. They opted for a cleaner pop rock oriented sound.
The next 10 years were a period of commercial success, they released three further albums, and spawned numerous hit-singles in Romania, like "Îţi mai aduci aminte" or "Cerceii tăi".

In 2012, Eugen Mihăescu decides to regroup the band's classic line-up, with old members Gabi "Guriță" Nicolau on vocals and Dragoș Docan on bass. The band continues to perform concerts sporadically throughout Romania, playing songs from their old hard rock catalogue.

Band members
 Eugen Mihăescu - Guitar
 Dragoș Docan - Bass
 Murdo - Vocals
 Claudiu Macarie - Drums

Former members

 Gabriel "Guriță" Nicolau - vocals
 Sandu "Butelie" Costel - vocals (Harap Alb, Tectonic, Voltaj, Act, Interval Quartz, Transilvania)
 Manuel Savu - guitar
 George Pătrănoiu - guitar
 Valentin Stoian - keyboards
 Răzvan Lupu "Lapi" - drums
 Cătălin Tuță - keyboards
 Andy Nucă - guitar
 Bogdan Cristea - vocals
 Niki Dinescu - drums
 Sorin Voinea - keyboards
 Cristi Ilie - vocals
 Cătălin Putingher - drums
 Cătălin Fotin - bass
 Narcis Nuț - bass
 Viorel Pițigoi - drums
 Ștefan Moisă - drums
 Gabi Nacu - guitar
 Liviu Pop - drums
 Romeo Dediu - guitar (Holograf)
 Gabriel Golescu - guitar
 Mihai Rotaru - drums
 George Lungu - bass
 Liviu Pop - tobe
 Marius Voicu - vocals
 Sorin Raicovescu - keyboards
 Adrian Fundescu - keyboards
 Narcis Dumitrache - drums
 Radu Marinescu - drums
 Octavian Cimpoca - guitar
 Cristi Sandu - guitar
 Ioan Luchian Mihalea - vocals
 Sorina Moldvai - vocals

Discography
 Formații rock 7 (split LP, 1982) 
 30 minute (LP/MC, 1988) 
 Fără teamă (LP/MC, 1990) 
 Lanțurile (2LP, 1992)
 Am dormit prea mult (CD, 1998) 
 Comercial (CD, 2001)
 Stresat de timp (CD, 2002)
 Deasupra lumii (CD, 2004)
 Mă prefac în ploi (CD, 2007)
 O parte din noi – Unplugged (CD, 2013) (acoustic album)

External links
 Unofficial Razvan Fodor fansite

References

Romanian hard rock musical groups
Romanian alternative rock groups
Musical groups established in 1982
Musical groups disestablished in 2005
1982 establishments in Romania